Granville Leveson-Gower, 1st Earl Granville,  (12 October 1773 – 8 January 1846), styled Lord Granville Leveson-Gower from 1786 to 1815 and The Viscount Granville from 1815 to 1833, was a British Whig statesman and diplomat from the Leveson-Gower family.

Background and education
Granville was the second son and youngest child of Granville Leveson-Gower, 1st Marquess of Stafford from his marriage to Lady Susanna Stewart, daughter of Alexander Stewart, 6th Earl of Galloway. His elder, paternal half-brother was George Leveson-Gower, 1st Duke of Sutherland.

Granville was educated at Dr. Kyle's school at Hammersmith, and then privately by John Chappel Woodhouse. He matriculated at Christ Church, Oxford, in April 1789 but never took a degree. Nevertheless, ten years later, in 1799, the honorary degree of DCL was conferred upon him.

Career
Granville began his career as a member of the House of Commons, representing Lichfield from 1795 to 1799, and Staffordshire for the next sixteen years. From 1797 to 1799 he was Colonel of the 2nd Staffordshire Militia. Granville served as British ambassador to Russia (10 August 1804 – 28 November 1805 and 1806–1807) and France (1824–1828, 1830–1835, 1835–1841).

In 1815 he was raised to the peerage as Viscount Granville of Stone Park in the County of Stafford. In 1833 during his second stint as ambassador to France, he was created Earl Granville and also Baron Leveson of Stone Park in the County of Stafford.

Personal life
While a recent historian describes Granville as "a drab figure, the original stuffed-shirt – starch outside, sawdust within,", he was celebrated as a male beauty in his own time, with Prime Minister William Pitt the Younger comparing him to "Hadrian's Antinous".

Lord Granville married Lady Harriet Cavendish (1785–1862), daughter of William Cavendish, 5th Duke of Devonshire and Lady Georgiana Spencer, in 1809. They had two sons and two daughters:

Lady Susan Georgiana (d. 30 April 1866) married George Pitt-Rivers, 4th Baron Rivers. Together they had twelve children, eight of whom survived infancy.
Lady Georgiana Charlotte (d. 19 Jan 1885)
Granville George (11 May 1815 - 31 Mar 1891)
Granville William (2 Oct. 1816 - 1833)
Hon. Edward Frederick (3 May 1819 - 30 May 1907)

Prior to marrying Lady Harriet Cavendish in 1809, Granville was the lover of Lady Harriet's maternal aunt, Henrietta Ponsonby, Countess of Bessborough, née Lady Henrietta Frances Spencer, with whom he fathered two illegitimate children: Harriette Stewart and George Stewart. For seventeen years she "loved [Granville] to idolatry", but then, she understood that he must marry in order to further his career and assure his posterity, and so she actively collaborated in the arrangements for his wedding to Harriet (known in the family as "Harry-O"), who was understandably reluctant to marry her aunt's lover.

Granville had numerous other love affairs, including with Lady Hester Stanhope, the adventurer and antiquarian, who attempted suicide after he jilted her in 1804. It was speculated at the time, and by her biographers since, that Stanhope was pregnant at the time with Granville's child.

Lord Granville died in January 1846, aged 72. The Countess Granville died in November 1862, aged 77. A younger son William died in 1833.

References

Further reading

External links
 
 , 
 . Retrieved on 17 November 2008.

1773 births
1846 deaths
Alumni of Christ Church, Oxford
Ambassadors of the United Kingdom to Russia
British MPs 1790–1796
British MPs 1796–1800
Diplomatic peers
Earls Granville
Knights Grand Cross of the Order of the Bath
Members of the Parliament of Great Britain for English constituencies
Members of the Parliament of the United Kingdom for English constituencies
UK MPs 1801–1802
UK MPs 1802–1806
UK MPs 1806–1807
UK MPs 1807–1812
UK MPs 1812–1818
UK MPs who were granted peerages
Leveson-Gower, Granville
Leveson-Gower family
Ambassadors of the United Kingdom to France
Peers of the United Kingdom created by George III
Peers of the United Kingdom created by William IV
Staffordshire Militia officers